Hayward Heath is a historic name for a place now within the city of Hayward, California. It was the subject of a real estate promotion. A post office, separate from Hayward's post office, operated at Hayward Heath from 1916 to 1918.

References

Neighborhoods in Hayward, California
Populated places established in 1916